Krave may refer to:
Motorola Krave
Krave Jerky, a producer of flavored jerky
Krave (cereal), a Kellogg's breakfast cereal with chocolate filling

See also
Crave (disambiguation)